Eesti Päevaleht ("Estonia Daily") is a major daily Estonian newspaper, from the same publishers as the weekly Eesti Ekspress. It has a daily circulation of around 36,000.

History and profile
Eesti Päevaleht was founded on 5 June 1995, when the newspapers Hommikuleht, Päevaleht (previously Noorte Hääl) and Rahva Hääl were merged into a single publication. On 29 September 1995, Eesti Päevaleht merged with Eesti Sõnumid. In May 2011 the newspaper joined the Eesti Ajalehed group.

Another newspaper under the same name is published weekly in Stockholm, Sweden.

References

External links
 

1995 establishments in Estonia
Estonian-language newspapers
Mass media in Tallinn
Newspapers published in Estonia
Newspapers established in 1995